Paola Anabella Farías Alvarez, nicknamed La Cocotera  (b. 25 June 1974), is an Ecuadorian model, actress, and singer.

Early life
Paola Farías was born in Esmeraldas, Ecuador on 25 June 1974.

Personal life
She was married to Ecuadorian television personality Gustavo Navarro, and they had a daughter.

In 2008, she remarried to Xavier Moncayo, but had her second divorce on 27 December 2012.

Career
The next year, she appeared as a model on SiTV programs such as Guayaquil Caliente, Todos a Bailar, and Playa Fantasía. Other Canal Uno productions that Farías played in include Juego de manos, Ídolos de la bola, Fantasías en la Playa, Las travesuras de Pepito and Palabras al Viento. For four years, she was a member of the musical group Las Perlas del Pacífico.

In 2000, Farías left Canal Uno to begin her career in solo singing and reentered the television world the next year for the TC Televisión shows Emergencia and A flor de piel as an actress Todos a bailar and as a cheerleader.

She achieved fame as the protagonist of Ecuador's version of The Nanny in 2006.

Citations

1974 births
Living people
Ecuadorian television actresses
21st-century Ecuadorian women singers
Ecuadorian female models